Hozan Alan Senauke (born 1947) is a Soto Zen priest, folk musician and poet residing at the Berkeley Zen Center (BZC) in Berkeley, California, where he currently serves as Abbot. He is a former Executive Director of the Buddhist Peace Fellowship (BPF), holding that position from 1991 to 2001. Alan also was a founder of Think Sangha, a group of writers and intellectuals that are affiliated with the BPF and the International Network of Engaged Buddhists. Think Sangha is a group of individuals who meet together to identify some of the most pressing social issues that they feel engaged Buddhists should be addressing. Senauke, who was born to a secular Jewish family in Brooklyn, New York, arrived in the San Francisco Bay area in 1968 and soon started sitting at the Berkeley Zen Center. Along with his Dharma sister Maylie Scott, Senauke received Dharma transmission from his teacher Sojun Mel Weitsman in 1998 during a ceremony at Tassajara Zen Mountain Center.

Biography
Alan Senauke was born in 1947 to a secular Jewish family in Brooklyn, New York. While attending Columbia University, Senauke participated in the Columbia University strike of April 1968. That same year he left for California, arriving in the San Francisco Bay area where he began sitting zazen at the Berkeley Zen Center. He became Executive Director of the Buddhist Peace Fellowship in 1991, a position in which he served until 2001 (though he remains active in the organization). Though he was a peace and civil rights activist of the 1960s and 1970s, by the 1980s Senauke had more or less allowed his activism to become an exercise in intellectualism. His becoming director of BPF, as well as the emergence of the Persian Gulf War, allowed Alan's activist tendencies and Buddhist practice to merge. Together, he and his colleague Tova Green brought BPF to the forefront of American engaged Buddhism. Along with Green, Senauke helped the BPF "become a place in US society, and in the world, where the sources of violence could be contemplated. The debate on the Gulf War was vital to this development."

During the late 1990s Alan also was a founder of Think Sangha, a group of writers and intellectuals that are affiliated with the BPF and the International Network of Engaged Buddhists.  In 1998 Alan received shiho (or, Dharma transmission) from his teacher Sojun Mel Weitsman along with Maylie Scott at Tassajara Zen Mountain Center. Alan is a past board member of Nevada Desert Experience, an organization which holds various retreats, protests and conferences on the subject of nuclear testing. He is also the founder of the Clear View Project, which focuses on social change and relief efforts in Asia, most recently in Burma. As a result of the recent uprisings in Burma and the subsequent repression by Burma's Military Junta, Alan has become increasingly involved in activism related to the cause of the Burmese people. During 2008 and early 2009, Alan has made several trips to Burma along with other members of the Buddhist Peace Fellowship and visited communities and Buddhist temples affected by the repressive government. 

Alan was installed as Abbot of Berkeley Zen Center on January 31, 2021.

Alan was a member of the bluegrass ensemble Bluegrass Intentions with Suzy Thompson (fiddle, Cajun accordion, vocals), Eric Thompson (mandolin, guitar, vocals), Larry Cohea (bass, vocals), and Bill Evans (banjo, vocals). They released the 2002 album Old as Dirt on the Native and Fine record label.

Bibliography

Music

 Alan Senauke, Everything is Broken: Songs about Things as they Are, 2012

See also
Buddhism in the United States
Timeline of Zen Buddhism in the United States
Nevada Desert Experience

Notes

References

External links
Hozan Alan Senauke Interview

American folk guitarists
American male guitarists
American male poets
Engaged Buddhists
San Francisco Zen Center
Soto Zen Buddhists
Zen Buddhist priests
American Zen Buddhists
20th-century American Jews
Jewish poets
Living people
1947 births
Musicians from Brooklyn
Religious leaders from the San Francisco Bay Area
Guitarists from New York (state)
Guitarists from California
20th-century American guitarists
20th-century American male musicians
21st-century American Jews
Columbia College (New York) alumni